Point Arkwright is a coastal suburb in the Sunshine Coast Region, Queensland, Australia.

Geography

Point Arkwright is the location of Luther Heights Youth Camp, used by the Lutheran Youth of Queensland for their Christian Life Week Camps. It is a  site with 338 beds.

History
The headland which the suburb was named after was originally called Petrie Heads after the first settler of Brisbane Andrew Petrie who had explored this region of Southern Queensland in the early 1840s.

The headland being named as Point Arkwright would appear to post-date 1861 as that is the year that Lt. Heath RN named the associated headland of Point Cartwright as Point Raper. As both Point Cartwright and Point Arkwright are thought to have been named together in recognition of the English inventors, it would have to have been some time after 1861 when Point Raper was being used for Point Cartwright. The Point Arkwright name is believed to be named after Sir Richard Arkwright, who invented the machinery for cotton spinning factories. It is not known who bestowed the Point Arkwright name as it was obviously intended to be grouped with Point Cartwright, which was named after Edmund Cartwright who developed weaving and combing equipment which compliment Arkwright's inventions.

Education 
There are no schools in Point Arkwright. The nearest primary school is Coolum State School in Coolum Beach. The nearest secondary school is Coolum State High School also in Coolum Beach  and Coolum Beach Christian College in Yandina Creek, Queensland located 10 minutes from Coolum Beach.

References

Suburbs of the Sunshine Coast Region
Headlands of Queensland